2002 in Korea may refer to:
2002 in North Korea
2002 in South Korea